Nigritomyia is a genus of flies in the family Stratiomyidae.

Species
Nigritomyia albitarsis (Bigot, 1879)
Nigritomyia andamanensis Das, Sharma & Dev Roy, 1984
Nigritomyia basiflava Yang, Zhang & Li, 2014
Nigritomyia ceylonica Kertész, 1920
Nigritomyia cinerea (Doleschall, 1857)
Nigritomyia consobrina (Bigot, 1879)
Nigritomyia festinans (Walker, 1859)
Nigritomyia guangxiensis Li, Zhang & Yang, 2009
Nigritomyia maculipennis (Macquart, 1850)
Nigritomyia punctifrons James, 1969
Nigritomyia responsalis (Walker, 1865)
Nigritomyia separata James, 1969

References

Stratiomyidae
Brachycera genera
Taxa named by Jacques-Marie-Frangile Bigot
Diptera of Asia
Diptera of Australasia